Khelyulya is an urban locality (an urban-type settlement) under the administrative jurisdiction of the town of republic significance of Sortavala in the Republic of Karelia, Russia, located on the Tokhma River,  west of Petrozavodsk, the capital of the republic. As of the 2010 Census, its population was 2,793.

History
Urban-type settlement status was granted to Khelyulya in 1972.

Administrative and municipal status
Within the framework of administrative divisions, the urban-type settlement of Khelyulya is subordinated to the town of republic significance of Sortavala. As a municipal division, Khelyulya, together with two rural localities, is incorporated within Sortavalsky Municipal District as Khelyulskoye Urban Settlement.

References

Notes

Sources

External links
Unofficial website of Khelyulya

Urban-type settlements in the Republic of Karelia
Sortavala